Lingbao (postal: Lingpao) is a county-level city and the westernmost county-level division of Henan province, China, bordering the provinces of Shanxi to the north and Shaanxi to the west. In ancient times, the Hongnong Commandery was located approximately 20 km south of there. Since 2005, there is a HVDC back-to-back station built by ABB with a transmission rate of 360 MW.

Lingbao city has a population of 720,000 residents in 2006.

Administrative divisions
As 2012, this city is divided to 10 towns and 5 townships.
Towns

Townships

Climate

Transportation 
China National Highway 209

See also
Prince of Hongnong

References

External links
Lingbao official website 

County-level divisions of Henan
Sanmenxia
Cities in Henan